Pfinztal is a municipality in the district Karlsruhe, Baden-Württemberg, Germany. Its municipality consists of the villages Wöschbach, Berghausen, Söllingen and Kleinsteinbach, which were merged to one municipality in 1974.

Pfinztal is located on Bertha Benz Memorial Route.

Sports
Viktoria Berghausen (1906),  German association football club

Twin towns – sister cities

Pfinztal is twinned with:
 Rokycany, Czech Republic
 Vijfheerenlanden, Netherlands (formerly with Leerdam)

References

External links
Official website
Bertha Benz Memorial Route 

Karlsruhe (district)